Maiestas is a genus of insects in the family Cicadellidae, the vast majority of which were formerly placed in the genus Recilia.

Species

M. acuminata
M. affinis
M. agroeca (Dash & Viraktamath, 1998)
M. akashiensis (Matsumura, 1914)
M. albofasciata (Dash & Viraktamath, 1998)
M. albomaculata (Dash & Viraktamath, 1998)
M. alcanor (Linnavuori, 1969)
M. angustisecta (Linnavuori, 1962)
M. antea (Linnavuori, 1969)
M. arida (Dash & Viraktamath, 1998)
M. aulonias (Linnavuori, 1969)
M. banda
M. beieri (Dlabola, 1964)
M. belona (Dash & Viraktamath, 1998)
M. bengalensis (Dash & Viraktamath, 1998)
M. bicolor
M. bilineata (Dash & Viraktamath, 1998)
M. biproductus Xing & Li, 2012
M. bispinosa (Dash & Viraktamath, 1998)
M. botelensis
M. brevicula (Dash & Viraktamath, 1998)
M. brevis (Dash & Viraktamath, 1998)
M. butleri
M. campbelli
M. canariaca
M. canga (Kramer, 1962)
M. chalami Zahniser, McKamey & Dmitriev, 2012
M. chhota
M. clavata
M. coronata
M. crura Zhang & Duan, 2011
M. cuculata
M. cultella Zhang & Duan, 2011
M. dashi Webb & Viraktamath, 2009
M. deleta
M. delongi (Chalam & Rao, 2005)
M. dex
M. dinghuensis Zhang & Duan, 2011
M. dispar (Kramer, 1962)
M. distincta (Motschulsky, 1859)
M. dorsalis (Motschulsky, 1859)
M. elangatoocellatus (Motschulsky, 1859)
M. fletcheri (Pruthi, 1930)
M. formosiella
M. glabra (Cai & Britton, 2001)
M. hastata
M. hesperidium (Lindberg, 1958)
M. heuksandoensis (Kwon & Lee, 1979)
M. hopponis
M. horvathi (Then, 1896)
M. hospes (Kirkaldy, 1904)
M. illustris Distant, 1917
M. indicus (Pruthi, 1936)
M. intermedius (Melichar, 1903)
M. irisa Zhang & Duan, 2011
M. irwini Duan, Dietrich, and Zhang, 2017
M. ismenias (Linnavuori, 1969)
M. jagannathi (Dash & Viraktamath, 1995)
M. jamiensis (Matsumura, 1940)
M. jogensis (Dash & Viraktamath, 1998)
M. kalaffoensis
M. knighti Webb & Viraktamath, 2009
M. krameri (Rama Subba Rao & Ramakrishnan, 1988)
M. lactipennis (Kramer, 1962)
M. latifrons (Matsumura)
M. lobata
M. lucindae (Kirkaldy, 1907)
M. luodianensis Xing & Li, 2012
M. maculata (Pruthi, 1930)
M. menoni
M. mica
M. nakaharae
M. obongsanensis (Kwon & Lee)
M. oryzae (Matsumura)
M. pacifica
M. parapruthii (Chalam & Rao, 2005)
M. pararemigia Zhang & Duan, 2011
M. pileiformis Zhang & Duan, 2011
M. portica
M. pruthii (Metcalf, 1967)
M. pulviscula
M. remigia Zhang & Duan, 2011
M. rostriformis Zhang & Duan, 2011
M. rugulans
M. samuelsoni (Knight, 1976)
M. scalpella Zhang & Duan, 2011
M. schaeuffelei
M. schmidtgeni (Wagner, 1939)
M. scripta
M. semilimax
M. serrata Duan & Dietrich, 2017
M. setosa (Ahmed, Murtaza & Malik, 1988)
M. spiculata
M. subviridis (Metcalf, 1946)
M. systenos (Dash & Viraktamath, 1998)
M. tareni (Dash & Viraktamath, 1995)
M. transversa
M. trifasciata
M. trispinosa
M. trisuli
M. truncata
M. vagans (Distant, 1917)
M. variabilis (Dash & Viraktamath, 1998)
M. variegata
M. veinata (Pruthi, 1930)
M. vetus (Knight, 1975)
M. viraktamathi Zahniser, McKamey & Dmitriev, 2012
M. webbi Zhang & Duan, 2011
M. xanthocephala (Dash & Viraktamath)
M. yangae Zhang & Duan, 2011

See also 
 Shōnen Matsumura - entomologist

References

 

 
Cicadellidae genera
Deltocephalini